The southernmost of New Zealand's Manganui Rivers flows through the Taranaki Region of New Zealand's North Island. It initially flows east from its sources on the slopes of Taranaki/Mount Egmont, turning north close to Midhirst and joining with the waters of the Waitara River ten kilometres from the North Taranaki Bight coast.

See also
List of rivers of New Zealand

References

Rivers of Taranaki
Rivers of New Zealand